Empis picipes is a species of dance flies, in the fly family Empididae. It is included in the subgenus Euempis. It is found from Great Britain east to Poland, Slovakia and Hungary and from Fennoscandia south to Italy. It is not found on the Balkan Peninsula, except Greece.

References

External links
Fauna Europaea

Empis
Asilomorph flies of Europe
Insects described in 1804